The 2015 Penrith Panthers season was the 49th in the club's history. Coached by Ivan Cleary and captained by Peter Wallace, the team competed in the National Rugby League's 2015 Telstra Premiership. They also competed in the 2015 NRL Auckland Nines pre-season tournament.

The Panthers were riddled by injury throughout 2015, and as a result, used a total of 32 players over the course of the season - the most of any club for that year. The club finished the season in 11th place, managing to avoid the wooden spoon by defeating the last-placed Newcastle Knights in their final game. Despite this, the Panthers under 20s team won the 2015 National Youth Competition premiership.

Squad

Player transfers

Fixtures

NRL Auckland Nines
The NRL Auckland Nines is a pre-season rugby league nines competition featuring all 16 NRL clubs. The 2015 competition was played over two days on 31 January and 1 February at Eden Park. The Panthers featured in the Waiheke pool and played the Rabbitohs, Cowboys and Storm, losing all three of their games.

Regular season

Ladder

Statistics

Representative

Domestic

International 

1 - Selected as 20th Man, Moylan did not play during the series.
2 - Manu captained the Tongan side during their match against Samoa.

References

Penrith Panthers seasons
Penrith Panthers season